Sir Charles Albert Batho, 1st Baronet (7 October 1872 – 29 January 1938) was Lord Mayor of London from 1927  to 1928.

Batho was educated at Highgate School. He worked for the ship store and export merchants, Copland and Co. He was elected to the Common Council of the City of London in 1913. He became the Alderman of the Ward of Aldgate in 1921.

Notes 

1872 births
1938 deaths
People from Highgate
People educated at Highgate School
20th-century lord mayors of London
20th-century English politicians
Baronets in the Baronetage of the United Kingdom
Knights Bachelor